William Talley House is a historic home located at Wilmington, New Castle County, Delaware. It was built about 1770, as a one-room deep, two-room wide fieldstone dwelling.  The house has evolved to a -story, four bay, rectangular dwelling with a steep gable roof.

It has two rectangular inside end brick chimneys covered with stucco that project through the gable peak.

The shed-roofed, sun porch addition was built in the 1940s and a saltbox form rear frame addition was built in the 1960s.

It was added to the National Register of Historic Places in 1985.

References

Houses on the National Register of Historic Places in Delaware
Houses completed in 1770
Houses in Wilmington, Delaware
National Register of Historic Places in Wilmington, Delaware
1770 establishments in Delaware
Stone houses in Delaware